Defending champion Jan Kodeš successfully defended his title, defeating Ilie Năstase in the final, 8–6, 6–2, 2–6, 7–5 to win the men's singles tennis title at the 1971 French Open.

Seeds
The seeded players are listed below. Jan Kodeš is the champion; others show the round in which they were eliminated.

  Jan Kodeš (champion)
  Arthur Ashe (quarterfinals)
  Ilie Năstase (final)
  Cliff Richey (fourth round)
  Željko Franulović (semifinals)
  Stan Smith (quarterfinals)
  Marty Riessen (fourth round)
  Alex Metreveli (second round)
  Robert Lutz (fourth round)
  Roger Taylor (first round)
  Manuel Orantes (first round)
  Pierre Barthès (fourth round)
  Ion Țiriac (first round)
  Nikola Pilić (first round)
  Georges Goven (fourth round)
  Jaime Fillol Sr. (first round)

Qualifying

Draw

Key
 Q = Qualifier
 WC = Wild card
 LL = Lucky loser
 r = Retired

Finals

Section 1

Section 2

Section 3

Section 4

Section 5

Section 6

Section 7

Section 8

External links
 Association of Tennis Professionals (ATP) – 1971 French Open Men's Singles draw
1971 French Open – Men's draws and results at the International Tennis Federation

Men's Singles
French Open by year – Men's singles
1971 Grand Prix (tennis)